South European Society and Politics is a quarterly peer-reviewed academic journal in the social sciences, focusing on the region of Southern Europe. The journal covers both "old" and "new" Southern Europe, focusing on Cyprus, Greece, Italy, Malta, Portugal, Spain, and Turkey. The journal is published by Taylor and Francis and the editors-in-chief are Susannah Verney (National and Kapodistrian University of Athens) and Anna Bosco (University of Florence).

Abstracting and indexing
The journal is abstracted and indexed in:

According to the Journal Citation Reports, the journal has a 2017 impact factor of 2.155.

See also
List of political science journals

References

External links

English-language journals
Political science journals
Publications established in 1996
Quarterly journals
Taylor & Francis academic journals